Una mentira is a Mexican telenovela produced by Televisa for Telesistema Mexicano in 1967.

Cast 
 Silvia Derbez

Data to highlight 
Of is soap opera does not have much information.
It was filmed in black and white, with a total of 20 chapters.

References

External links 

Mexican telenovelas
1967 telenovelas
Televisa telenovelas
Spanish-language telenovelas
1967 Mexican television series debuts
1967 Mexican television series endings